The Anglican Shrine of Our Lady of Walsingham is a Church of England shrine church built in 1938 in Walsingham, Norfolk, England. Walsingham is the site of the reputed Marian apparitions to Richeldis de Faverches in 1061. The Virgin Mary is therefore venerated at the site with the title of Our Lady of Walsingham.

History
Richeldis de Faverches was an English noblewoman who is credited with establishing the original shrine to Our Lady at Walsingham. Before leaving to join the Second Crusade, her son and heir, Lord Geoffrey de Faverches left the Holy House and its grounds to his chaplain, Edwin, to establish a religious house to care for the chapel of Our Lady of Walsingham. The Priory passed into the care of Augustinian Canons somewhere between 1146 and 1174. As travelling abroad became more difficult during the time of the Crusades, Walsingham became a place of pilgrimage, ranking alongside Jerusalem, Rome and Santiago de Compostela. The shrine was visited by Erasmus around 1512, by which time the shrine was reputed to have been built by angels in the late eleventh century as a replica of the Virgin's house in Nazareth, and he satirised the devotion of pilgrims at the site in the 1526 edition of his Colloquies. The shrine was destroyed by Henry VIII in 1538. The statue of Our Lady of Walsingham was burnt at Chelsea.

Father Alfred Hope Patten SSC, appointed as the Church of England Vicar of Walsingham in 1921, ignited Anglican interest in the pre-Reformation pilgrimage. It was his idea to create a new statue of Our Lady of Walsingham based on the image depicted on the seal of the medieval priory. In 1922 the statue was set up in the Parish Church of St Mary and regular pilgrimage devotion followed. From the first night that the statue was placed there, people gathered around it to pray, asking Mary to join her prayers with theirs.

Throughout the 1920s the trickle of pilgrims became a flood of large numbers for whom, eventually, the Pilgrim Hospice was opened (a hospice is the name of a place of hospitality for pilgrims) and, in 1931, a new Holy House encased in a small pilgrimage church was dedicated and the statue translated there with great solemnity.  In 1938 that church was enlarged to form the Anglican Shrine of Our Lady of Walsingham. The enlarged church was blessed on Whit Monday, and thereafter a pilgrimage took place each year on that day, moving with the Whit Monday bank holiday to the Spring bank holiday in 1971. Since 1959 the Whit Monday Pilgrimage has been known as the National Pilgrimage.

During World War II, Walsingham was a restricted zone closed to visitors, but in May 1945, American Forces organised the first Mass in the priory grounds since the Reformation.

Father Patten combined the posts of Vicar of Walsingham and priest administrator of the Anglican shrine until his death in 1958, whereupon the Revd John Colin Stephenson became administrator of the shrine, but declined to take on the role of vicar. Enid Chadwick contributed to the artwork in the shrine.

Present day
The shrine church was substantially extended in the 1960s. The church has a holy well known for its healing properties; the act of receiving water from the holy well is often accompanied by the laying on of hands and anointing. Water from the well is often taken home by the faithful and distributed to their family, friends and parishioners.

The grounds include the shrine church, gardens, several chapels, a refectory, a café, a shrine shop, a visitors' centre, the Pilgrim Hall, an orangery, the College (home to priests-associate when in residence), and a large number of different residential blocks for the accommodation of resident pilgrims.

In  1947 three sisters of the Society of Saint Margaret moved to Walsingham to help at the shrine. The Priory of Our Lady, Walsingham, was founded in 1955 as a daughter priory, and gained independence as an autonomous house of the Order in 1994. The sisters welcome guests and work in the shrine; they are also involved in educational work.

Associated groups
Beyond the staff (who include a resident community, and external day staff) a number of groups are officially associated with the life of the shrine. These include:
 The Association of Priests Associate of the Holy House, founded in 1931, an association of priests who undertake to offer Mass for the shrine and who enjoy certain privileges at the shrine; the Superior General of the Association is, ex officio, the Priest Administrator of the Shrine; since December 2011 full membership has also been available to deacons, as Deacons Associate of the Holy House; it has around 2,000 members. Membership is open to male priests of any Church in communion with the See of Canterbury, and to both male and female deacons of those churches. A membership badge is worn, distinguished by a dark blue enamel background for priests, and light blue for deacons.
 The Society of Our Lady of Walsingham, whose members meet in local cells around the world, and pray for the life of the shrine; it was founded in 1925; the Superior General of the Society is, ex officio, the Priest Administrator of the Shrine; members commit to the daily recitation of the Angelus, as an act of remembrance of the Shrine.
 The Order of Our Lady of Walsingham, founded in 1953, its members (originally known as "dames" if women, "clerks" if priests, or "lay clerks" if lay men) are admitted as a reward for service to the shrine; they have special privileges at Walsingham, and meet in annual chapter; since 2000 both women and men, lay or ordained, are simply styled "member" of the order; the previously complex regalia has also been replaced with a simple cross and collarette for all members. Membership is limited, at around 60 people.
 The College of Guardians of the Shrine, who hold capitular responsibility for the governing of the shrine; there are 20 Guardians, ordained and lay, one of whom is elected Master of the Guardians; they have distinctive regalia, including a collarette and star, and a blue velvet mantle; they are trustees of the Shrine and its registered charity; in addition to the 20 there is also a small number of honorary Guardians.

List of priest administrators
 Fr Alfred Hope Patten SSC (1938 to 1958); founder and first priest administrator
 Fr John Colin Stephenson MBE (1958 to 1968)
 Fr Charles David Smith (1968 to 1972)
 Fr Alan Vincent Careful (1973 to 1981)
 Canon Christopher Colven (1981 to 1986)
 Fr Roy Fellows (1987 to 1993)
 Fr Martin Warner SSC (1993 to 2002)
 Fr Philip North CMP (2002 to 2008)
 The Rt Revd Lindsay Urwin OGS (2009 to 2015); previously Bishop of Horsham
 Fr Kevin Smith (2016 to present)

References

External links
 Official website

1931 establishments in England
1938 establishments in England
Anglo-Catholic church buildings in Norfolk
Shrines to the Virgin Mary
Anglican Mariology
Walsingham